Timothy Garton Ash CMG FRSA (born 12 July 1955) is a British historian, author and commentator. He is Professor of European Studies at Oxford University. Most of his work has been concerned with the contemporary history of Europe, with a special focus on Central and Eastern Europe.

He has written about the former Communist regimes of that region, their experience with the secret police, the Revolutions of 1989 and the transformation of the former Eastern Bloc states into member states of the European Union. He has also examined the role of Europe in the world and the challenge of combining political freedom and diversity, especially in relation to free speech.

Education
Garton Ash was born to John Garton Ash (1919–2014) and Lorna Judith Freke. His father was educated at Trinity Hall, Cambridge and was involved in finance, as well as being a Royal Artillery officer in the British Army during the Second World War. Garton Ash was educated at St Edmund's School, Hindhead, Surrey, before going on to Sherborne School, a public school in Dorset in South West England, followed by Exeter College, Oxford, where he studied Modern History.

For postgraduate study he went to St Antony's College, Oxford, and then, in the still divided Berlin, the Free University in West Berlin and the Humboldt University in East Berlin. During his studies in East Berlin, he was under surveillance from the Stasi, which served as the basis for his 1997 book The File. Garton Ash cut a suspect figure to the Stasi, who regarded him as a "bourgeois-liberal" and potential British spy. 

Although he denies being or having been a British intelligence operative, Garton Ash described himself as a "soldier behind enemy lines" and described the German Democratic Republic as a "very nasty regime indeed."

Life and career
In the 1980s Garton Ash was Foreign Editor of The Spectator and a columnist for The Independent. He became a Fellow at St Antony's College, Oxford, in 1989, a senior fellow at Stanford University's Hoover Institution in 2000, and Professor of European Studies at the University of Oxford in 2004. He has written a (formerly weekly) column in The Guardian since 2004 and is a long-time contributor to the New York Review of Books. His column is also translated in the Turkish daily Radikal and in the Spanish daily El País, as well as other papers.

In 2005, Garton Ash was listed in Time magazine as one of the 100 most influential people. The article says that "shelves are where most works of history spend their lives. But the kind of history Garton Ash writes is more likely to lie on the desks of the world's decision makers."

Geopolitics
Garton Ash describes himself as a liberal internationalist. He is a supporter of what he calls the free world and liberal democracy, represented in his view by the European Union, the United States as a superpower, and Angela Merkel's leadership of Germany. Garton Ash opposed Scottish independence and argued for Britishness, writing in The Guardian: "being British has changed into something worth preserving, especially in a world of migration where peoples are going to become ever more mixed up together. As men and women from different parts of the former British empire have come to live here in ever larger numbers, the post-imperial identity has become, ironically but not accidentally, the most liberal, civic, inclusive one."

Garton Ash first came to prominence during the Cold War as a supporter of free speech and human rights within countries which were part of the Soviet Union and Eastern Bloc, paying particular attention to Poland and Germany. In more recent times he has represented a British liberal pro-EU viewpoint, nervous at the rise of Vladimir Putin, Donald Trump and Brexit. He is strongly opposed to conservative and populist leaders of EU nations, such as Viktor Orbán of Hungary, arguing that Merkel should "freeze him out", evoking "appeasement". Garton Ash was particularly upset about Orbán's move against George Soros' Central European University. Anti-Soviet themes and Poland remain topics of interest for Garton Ash; once a promoter of the anti-Eastern Bloc movement in Poland, he notes with regret the move away from liberalism and globalism towards populism and authoritarianism under socially conservative political and religious leaders such as Jarosław Kaczyński, in a similar manner to his criticisms of Hungary's Orbán.

Personal life
Garton Ash and his Polish-born wife Danuta live primarily in Oxford, England, and also near Stanford University in California as part of his work with the Hoover Institution. They have two sons, Tom Ash, a web developer based in Canada, and Alec Ash, a writer living in China. His elder brother, Christopher, is a Church of England clergyman.

Bibliography
Und willst du nicht mein Bruder sein ... Die DDR heute (Rowohlt, 1981) 
The Polish Revolution: Solidarity, 1980–82 (Scribner, 1984) 
The Uses of Adversity: Essays on the Fate of Central Europe (Random House, 1989) 
The Magic Lantern: The Revolution of 1989 Witnessed in Warsaw, Budapest, Berlin, and Prague (Random House, 1990) 
In Europe's Name: Germany and the Divided Continent (Random House, 1993) 
The File: A Personal History (Random House, 1997) 
History of the Present: Essays, Sketches, and Dispatches from Europe in the 1990s (Allen Lane, 1999) 
Free World: America, Europe, and the Surprising Future of the West (Random House, 2004) 
Facts are Subversive: Political Writing from a Decade without a Name (Atlantic Books, 2009) 
Civil Resistance and Power Politics: The Experience of Non-violent Action from Gandhi to the Present (Oxford University Press, 2011) 
Free Speech: Ten Principles for a Connected World (Yale University Press, 2016) 
Civil Resistance in the Arab Spring: Triumphs and Disasters (Oxford University Press, 2016) 
Obrona Liberalizmu (Fundacja Kultura Liberalna, 2022) ISBN  9788366619067
Homelands: A Personal History of Europe (Yale University Press, 2023)

Awards and honours
Somerset Maugham Award, for The Polish Revolution: Solidarity (1984)
Prix Européen de l'Essai Charles Veillon (1989)
Premio Napoli, for journalism (1995) 
Order of Merit from the Czech Republic
Order of Merit from Germany
Order of Merit of the Republic of Poland
Honorary doctorate from St Andrews University, Scotland
Hoffmann von Fallersleben Prize for political writing (2002)
Companion of the Order of St Michael and St George (CMG)
 Orwell Prize for journalism (2006)
Kullervo Killinen Prize from Finland (2006)
Honorary doctorate from Katholieke Universiteit Leuven, Belgium
Fellow of the Royal Society of Arts (FRSA)
Charlemagne Prize (2017)

See also
 European Council on Foreign Relations
 Appel de Blois
 Project Forum

Notes

External links

 Official Website
 Articles by Timothy Garton Ash  at Journalisted
 Column archives at The Guardian
Contributions to the New York Review of Books
 Dahrendorf Programme for the Study of Freedom
 Free Speech Debate

 Garton Ash on Facts Are Subversive
 In dialogue with Aung San Suu Kyi
 Stanford public lecture

1955 births
Living people
British foreign policy writers
British male journalists
Fellows of St Antony's College, Oxford
Alumni of Exeter College, Oxford
Hoover Institution people
Historians of Europe
Cold War historians
Theorists on Western civilization
The Guardian journalists
Fellows of the Royal Historical Society
Fellows of the Royal Society of Literature
Companions of the Order of St Michael and St George
Recipients of the Cross of the Order of Merit of the Federal Republic of Germany
People educated at Sherborne School
Members of the European Academy of Sciences and Arts
British columnists
Carnegie Council for Ethics in International Affairs